Milton Mignot Jordan (May 24, 1927 – May 13, 1993) was an American professional baseball player, a ,  right-handed pitcher who appeared in eight Major League games for the  Detroit Tigers. He was born in Mineral Springs, Clearfield County, Pennsylvania, and served in the United States Army Air Forces during World War II.

Jordan's nine-season (1948–1956) career was spent entirely in the Tiger organization. His Major League trial came at the outset of the 1953 campaign. After two scoreless appearances as a relief pitcher, Jordan was given his only MLB starting assignment by manager Fred Hutchinson on April 22 against the Chicago White Sox at Briggs Stadium. In the second inning he surrendered three runs but went on to last seven full innings, giving up six runs, all earned and 12 hits, including home runs by Chicago's Sam Mele, Sherm Lollar and Vern Stephens. He departed with the Tigers trailing 6–1, and absorbed the loss in an eventual 9–7 defeat. It was his only Major League decision.  In 17 innings, he allowed 26 hits, 11 earned runs and five bases on balls, with four strikeouts.

In 1953, Jordan won 12, lost only once, and compiled a 3.11 earned run average for the Triple-A Buffalo Bisons of the International League, mostly working as a relief pitcher.

References

External links

1927 births
1993 deaths
Baseball players from Pennsylvania
Buffalo Bisons (minor league) players
Detroit Tigers players
Durham Bulls players
Jamestown Falcons players
Little Rock Travelers players
Major League Baseball pitchers
People from Clearfield County, Pennsylvania
Toledo Mud Hens players
United States Army Air Forces personnel of World War II
Williamsport Tigers players